Lalage may refer to:

Biology
 Lalage (bird), the genus of the triller birds
 Lalage, a synonym of the legume genus Bossiaea

People
 Lalage Bown (born 1927), English educator
 Lalage, for whom the Roman poet Horace professes his love in "Integer vitae", a famous poem in Carminum liber primus
 Lalage Mary Kathleen Acland, wife of Sir Hubert Acland, 4th Baronet
 Constance Lalage Thompson, wife of Sir Edward Wakefield, 1st Baronet
 Mary Wakefield (journalist) (Mary Elizabeth Lalage Wakefield), British journalist

Other uses
 Lalage, the main character of Poe's 1835 play Politian
 822 Lalage, an asteroid
 Lalage, a boat in the 6 Metre sailing event at the 1936 and 1948 Olympics

See also